Madih Belaïd (born 1 January 1974), is a Tunisian filmmaker. He is best known as the director of critically acclaimed television serials and feature films Naouret El Hawa, Al Akaber and Allo.

Personal life
He was born on 1 January 1974 in Sousse, Tunisia. He is married to Tunisian actress Rim Riahi where the couple has three children.

Career
He studied filmmaking at the Maghrebian Institute of Cinema in Tunis from 1994 to 1997. After various internships in audiovisual and directing, he became assistant director on several shoots in Tunisia and abroad and took part in scriptwriting workshops in France, Germany and Morocco. In 1996, he wrote and directed first short films: Tout bouille rien ne bouge. The he directed his graduation film, Croix X in 2006 as the second short. With the success of the two shorts, he made his third short L'Ascenseur in 2007 and later Allô in 2008.

In 2014, he received the prize for best production for the soap opera Naouret El Hawa at the Romdhane Awards awarded by Mosaïque FM. In the same year, he was appointed as a jury member for the second edition of the Les Nuits du court métrage Tunisien festival in Paris. In 2016, he won the award for Best Director for the soap opera Al Akaber at the Romdhane Awards.

Filmography

References

External links
 

Living people
Tunisian film directors
Tunisian film actors
1974 births
Tunisian television directors